Noorani (Arabic: نوراني) is a Muslim surname, derived from the Persian nurani, meaning "luminous" or "bright", from the Arabic nur, meaning "light". Alternative spellings include Noorany, Nourani and Nurani. The name may refer to:

A. G. Noorani (born 1930), Indian lawyer and historian
Ali Noorani (born 1977), American political activist
Asif Noorani (born 1942), Pakistani writer
Ehsaan Noorani (born 1963), Indian musician
Kaukab Noorani Okarvi (born 1957), Pakistani scholar
Syed Muhammad Shah Noorani (born 1951), Pakistani religious leader
Tasneem Noorani, Pakistani bureaucrat

References

Arabic-language surnames
Indian surnames
Pakistani names